Queers Undermining Israeli Terrorism (QUIT!) is a gay San Francisco Bay Area political action group supporting boycott, divestment & sanctions against Israel; and opposing Pinkwashing of the alleged ethnic cleansing of the Palestinian people. It was founded in early 2001 by a member of LAGAI-Queer Insurrection.

Goals

The group "supports divestment, the right of return for all Palestinians, immediate Israeli withdrawal from Palestinian territories and describes Zionism as racism."

The group opposes Pinkwashing  (promoting through an appeal to "queer-friendliness") of the Israeli government and its anti-Palestinian policies.

Activities

Protests/Campaigns
 February, 2002—QUIT! participated in the National Student Conference of the Palestine Solidarity Movement on the Berkeley campus of the University of California.
 June, 2002—QUIT! "initiated" a " 'No pride in occupation' anti-war contingent that marched in solidarity with the Palestinian people" in San Francisco's Lesbian, Gay, Bisexual and Transgender Pride March.
 August, 2002–25 members of the group reportedly "took over" a Starbucks in Berkeley in protest of the firm's stores in Israel and CEO Howard Schultz's support for Israel.
 June, 2003—The screening of an Israeli film, Yossi & Jagger, at San Francisco's San Francisco International Lesbian and Gay Film Festival is disrupted by QUIT! activists. The protest "outraged" Yossi Amrani, the Israeli Consul General and caused a minor local media flap.
 June, 2003—QUIT! begins its campaign against the cosmetic company Estée Lauder outside of a Macy's department store in San Francisco. The company is targeted because of Ronald Lauder's, the company's founder, support for Israel and his service as president of the Jewish National Fund.
 In 2004, the Estee Lauder Companies boycott campaign titled "Estee Slaughter" was financed, in part, by a $1500 grant from RESIST.

Founder Arrested in West Bank & Israel
In December, 2004, one of QUIT!'s founders, Kate Bender-Raphael was arrested by Israeli authorities while "filming a clash between Israeli soldiers and activists protesting the building of the separation barrier in the West Bank village of Bil'in." Bender-Raphael had been arrested in Israel and deported in 2003 "also for filming the Israel Defense Forces' reaction to a demonstration against the barrier." As a result of her arrest, QUIT! staged a protest outside the Israeli Consulate in San Francisco.

Boycott World Pride Jerusalem
In late 2004, in response to Interpride's decision that the Israeli group Jerusalem Open House would host the second World Pride parade in 2005, QUIT! launched a  Boycott World Pride campaign.  The boycott picked up steam after the event was postponed until August 2006 because of the pullout of the Israeli settlements from the Gaza Strip.  QUIT and many other individuals and organizations contended that it was inappropriate to hold an event titled "Love Without Borders" in a city bisected by a 30-foot concrete wall. The  International Gay and Lesbian Human Rights Commission (IGLHRC) decided, in March 2006, not to participate in World Pride Jerusalem, stating, "IGLHRC recognizes that many LGBTI people in the region who wish to attend World Pride 2006, named 'Love without Borders,' will be unable to do so due to travel restrictions and conditions that limit mobility and participation."

San Francisco LGBT Film Festival
In March, 2007, QUIT! and the South West Asian, North African Bay Area Queers (SWANABAQ) initiated a campaign to pressure Frameline, the organizer of the San Francisco International LGBT Film Festival, to cut its ties with the Israeli government. In an open letter signed by more than 100 artists and writers, including Sophie Fiennes, Elia Suleiman, Ken Loach, Haim Bresheeth, Jenny Morgan, John Berger, Arundhati Roy, Ahdaf Soueif, Eduardo Galeano, Brian Eno, and Leon Rosselson, Frameline was asked "to honor calls for an international boycott of Israeli political and cultural institutions, by discontinuing Israeli consulate sponsorship of the LGBT film festival and not cosponsoring events with the Israeli consulate."

References

External links

 

Organizations established in 2001
Anti-Zionism in the United States
Anti-Zionist organizations
State of Palestine–United States relations
Non-governmental organizations involved in the Israeli–Palestinian conflict
Boycott organizers
Community organizing
Protests in the United States
LGBT organizations in the United States
Israel–United States relations
Queer organizations
Palestinian solidarity movement
2001 establishments in California
Organizations based in San Francisco